The 2017–18 season is a season played by Anderlecht, a Belgian football club based in Anderlecht, Brussels. The season covers the period from 1 July 2017 to 30 June 2018. Anderlecht will be participating in the Belgian First Division A, Belgian Super Cup, Belgian Cup and the UEFA Champions League.

Review and events
After winning the 2016–17 First Division A, Anderlecht opened the 2017–18 season with a Belgian Super Cup victory over Zulte Waregem, winners of the 2016–17 Belgian Cup in the first Belgian football match to feature the use of a video assistant referee.

Match details

Belgian First Division A

Regular season

Matches

Championship play-off

Belgian Super Cup

Belgian Cup

UEFA Champions League

Group stage

Appearances and goals
Source:
Numbers in parentheses denote appearances as substitute.
Players with names struck through and marked  left the club during the playing season.
Players with names in italics and marked * were on loan from another club for the whole of their season with Anderlecht.
Players listed with no appearances have been in the matchday squad but only as unused substitutes.
Key to positions: GK – Goalkeeper; DF – Defender; MF – Midfielder; FW – Forward

Transfers

In

Out

Loans

In

Out

Awards

See also
2017–18 in Belgian football
2017–18 Belgian First Division A
2017–18 Belgian Cup
2017–18 UEFA Champions League
2017 Belgian Super Cup

References

Anderlecht
R.S.C. Anderlecht seasons
Anderlecht